Bandha (बन्ध, a Sanskrit term for "binding, bond, arrest, capturing, putting together" etc.) may refer to:

 Bandha (yoga)
 Bandha (Jainism)

See also
 Ashtanga Vinyasa Yoga#Bandhas
 Bandhu
 Trul khor
 Karma in Jainism
 Bandh, a strike forced upon the population by a community or political party in India or Nepal